The 2015–16 season was Malmö Redhawks's first season back in the SHL, the premier league in Swedish ice hockey, since the 2006–07 season and the first time since the league was renamed. The regular season began on 17 September 2015 away against Brynäs IF, and  concluded on 8 March 2016 away against Linköping HC. The team finished in 12th place and therefore failed to qualify for the play-offs.

Standings

2015–16 SHL season

Schedule and results

Pre-season

Regular season

Roster
Updated on 21 October 2015.

References

Malmo
Malmö Redhawks seasons